Throop Peak is a  peak of the San Gabriel Mountains, in the San Gabriel Mountains National Monument and Angeles National Forest, in Los Angeles County, California.

The high peak provides views of both the Mojave Desert and the Los Angeles Basin all the way to the ocean. The peak was named for Amos G. Throop, founder of Caltech, formerly called Throop College. The peak marks the northwestern boundary of the Sheep Mountain Wilderness.

Access
A trailhead for climbing Throop Peak is located at Dawson Saddle along the Angeles Crest Highway. The route goes through a forest of Jeffrey Pine, Sugar Pine, and the high elevation Lodgepole Pine with some White Fir.

Climbing Season
The most popular seasons for climbing Throop Peak are spring and fall because of the cooler temperatures and easy accessibility.

References

External links
 

Mountains of Los Angeles County, California
San Gabriel Mountains
San Gabriel Mountains National Monument
Angeles National Forest
Mountains of Southern California